Frank Caine (28 July 1881 – 19 January 1930) was an Australian rules footballer in the Victorian Football League.

Football
Caine made his debut for the Carlton Football Club against St Kilda in Round 7 of the 1905 season. He went on to play 80 games and kick 147 goals for the Blues.

In a huge coup for North Melbourne, Caine was poached from Carlton in early 1910 along with ‘Mallee’ Johnson, Fred Jinks, and Charlie Hammond. He helped North to their third VFA premiership in 1910, and also topped the Association's goalkicking standings for that season, kicking a new record of 75 goals (including finals).

In 1912 Caine moved to Essendon, where he played a further 22 games.

Notes

References

External links
 Frank Caine at Blueseum

1881 births
1930 deaths
Australian rules footballers from Victoria (Australia)
Australian Rules footballers: place kick exponents
Carlton Football Club players
Carlton Football Club Premiership players
Essendon Football Club players
Essendon Football Club Premiership players
North Melbourne Football Club (VFA) players
Three-time VFL/AFL Premiership players